Jane Vandiver Kidd (born February 12, 1953) is a retired American politician from Georgia.

She was born Jane Brevard Vandiver in Lavonia as one of three children of former Governor Ernest Vandiver and Betty Russell, and is a grandniece of U.S. Senator Richard B. Russell through her mother. Kidd attended Queens College (now Queens University of Charlotte), and graduated from University of Georgia where she received a bachelor's degree in journalism. She held a job at WNEG (AM) as a disc jockey, and later worked University of Georgia Public television (WUGA). After her marriage to David Kidd, she moved to Lavonia, GA  She worked at Clemson University in South Carolina, as a television and radio editor, and then returned to UGA to begin working as a national media relations director for several colleges and universities, and the MacArthur Foundation.

Kidd was elected in 1980 in Lavonia City Council, serving three two-year terms. In 1986, she moved to Athens, GA and worked for Gehrung Associates, as a media relations consultant for the Keene, NH firm. In 1992, she served as campaign manager for Don Johnson Jr.'s successful run for Congress, and served as his district director during his one term in Congress. In 1996 Kidd returned to UGA as fundraiser and alumni director for The State Botanical Garden of Georgia and the Grady College of Journalism. In 2004, Kidd ran for Georgia House of Representatives for the 115th district and won against Republican candidate Bill Cowsert, but after a single term in the House, lost her bid for Georgia Senate District 46 to Cowsert. Kidd was then elected chair of the Democratic Party of Georgia in 2007, which she would lead until 2011.

Kidd returned to higher education public relations in 2012 when she became Special Assistant to the President of Piedmont University in Demorest and Athens, GA . Kidd received a Masters in Media Technology in 2016 from Piedmont University.  Kidd retired from Piedmont University in 2019.

Jane and David Kidd are the parents of Frances Elizabeth Kidd (Matthew) Hogan (b. 1979)  and David Alexander Kidd, Jr. (b. 1982). Both children are married and the Hogans have two children, Allie and Sam.

References

Democratic Party members of the Georgia House of Representatives
1953 births
Living people
Queens University of Charlotte alumni
People from Lavonia, Georgia
21st-century American politicians
State political party chairs of Georgia (U.S. state)